The North Adams SteepleCats are a Collegiate summer baseball team based in North Adams, Massachusetts, United States. The team, a member of the New England Collegiate Baseball League, plays its home games at Joe Wolfe Field in North Adams.

Postseason appearances

SteepleCats alumni
Former SteepleCats Joe Smith, Bobby Wilson, Mike Ekstrom, Blake Davis, Evan Scribner and Cody Stanley have played in the major leagues. SteepleCats alumni who have gone on to play minor league baseball include Eric Brown, Cole Gillespie, Chris Homer, Kris Watts, Davis Bilardello, Derrick Alfonso, Chris Cates, Jeremy Hamilton, Logan Johnson, Brandon Menchaca, Matt Morizio, Timothy Pahuta, Anthony Seratelli, Chantz Mack, Jeff Roy, Scott Squier, John Servidio, Vinny Siena, Josh Delph, Nathan Foriest, J C Cardenas, Joeanthony Rivera, Kevin Martir, José Cuas, Tyler Palmer, Sheehan Planas-Arteaga, Dillon McNamara, Christian MacDonald, Cameron Griffin, Brett Frantini, Brian Gilbert, Cameron Copping, Marc Magliaro, Robert Nixon, Cory Vogt, Devin Shines, Cam Kneeland, Tyler Deloach, Sean Albury, Guido Knudson, Eric Perrault, Brandon Macias, David Villasuso, Dylan Silva, Noah Vaughan, and Liam Sabino.

See also
New England Collegiate Baseball League

External links
 North Adams Steeplecats Official Site
 NECBL Website

New England Collegiate Baseball League teams
Amateur baseball teams in Massachusetts
North Adams, Massachusetts
2002 establishments in Massachusetts
Baseball teams established in 2002